The Hackenköpfe are a row of peaks in the western Kaisergebirge range in Austria. They are located in the ridge running west from the Sonneck between the Treffauer and Scheffauer. To the north their rock faces, up to 800 metres high, drop into the Kaisertal valley; to the south they present steep, craggy rock flanks. They are most usually scaled either over the arête from the Sonneck or along the one from the Scheffauer. Both normal routes include sections of UIAA grade II climbs and are not signed or secured. The popular, but challenging crossing of the crest running from the Scheffauer to the Sonneck from the base at Scheffau am Wilden Kaiser also involves the Hackenköpfe.

Mountains of the Alps
Mountains of Tyrol (state)
Two-thousanders of Austria
Kaiser Mountains